The Accomplice is a 1917 American silent drama film directed by Ralph Dean and starring Dorothy Bernard, Jack Sherrill and Jean Stuart.

Plot 
Spoiled and lonely daughter of a wealthy Wall Street entrepreneur, Katherine Harcourt, wanders into the Tango Tea Set and meets the charismatic Antonio, a professional dancer. Infatuated, Katherine follows Antonio to his hotel room but, at the last moment, rejects his advances and leaves at the point of a knife. Later that night, Pepita, Antonio's lover, is found murdered and Antonio is arrested. 

As his alibi, Antonio claims that he was with Katherine. To save the Harcourt name from scandal, Miriam Collins, the sweetheart of Dick Harcourt, Katherine's brother, says that she, not Katherine, was in Antonio's room. Although Miriam's gesture is an attempt to improve her image with Dick's father, who thinks that she is too poor for his son, it soon backfires and Dick breaks off their engagement. 

Guilt-ridden, Katherine finally confesses to knowing Antonio, clearing both her own and Miriam's name. With the blessing of Mr. Harcourt, Miriam and Dick reunite.

Cast
 Dorothy Bernard as Katherine Harcourt
 Jack Sherrill as Dick Harcourt
 W.J. Brady as Honorable Nicholas Harcourt
 Joseph Granby as Antonio
 Jean Stuart as Pepita
 Florence Hamilton as Miriam Collins
 John A. Milton as Inspector 
 Tom Ward as Jose

References

Bibliography
 Jay Robert Nash & Stanley Ralph Ross. The Motion Picture Guide, Volume 10. Cinebooks, 1985.

External links
 

1917 films
1917 drama films
1910s English-language films
American silent feature films
Silent American drama films
American black-and-white films
1910s American films